Type L submarine may refer to one of the following classes of submarines based on the :

 Japanese Type L submarine, a class of submarine for the Imperial Japanese Navy; built in the mid-1920s and active in World War II
 Soviet Type L submarine, an alternate name for the Soviet Navy's ; built between 1931–1941 and active during World War II; most decommissioned by the 1950s

See also
 Type I submarine